Omar Mohammed Ali Rezaq ( Omar Marzouki; born 1957/1958) is a Lebanese-born Palestinian militant who is the lone surviving hijacker of EgyptAir Flight 648 in 1985. He was a member of Abu Nidal. The plane was hijacked by a group of three people. The remaining two hijackers were killed, either during in-flight shooting with the plane's sky marshal, Methad Mustafa Kamal, or after Egyptian commandos stormed the hijacked plane.

Rezaq had given his name as Omar Marzouki and used a Tunisian passport when boarding the plane at Athens airport, but later admitted that he is of Palestinian origin. The FBI determined that "Omar Marzouki" was his real name while "Omar Mohammed Ali Rezaq" was an alias, as its initials (O.M.A.R.) make the name easy to remember.

During hours of negotiations while the plane was on the ground at Luqa airport in Malta, five passengers were shot, three of whom survived. On 24 November 1985, Egyptian commandos set explosives that ignited a fire, suffocating many of the passengers. Rezaq was wounded in a subsequent shootout (his left lung was pierced by a bullet and attacked with a hatchet by the pilot), but recovered and was arraigned in a Maltese court on 12 December 1986. Preliminary inquiry lasted until 3 April 1987, and on 2 November 1988, Rezaq pleaded guilty to seven of the nine charges against him. These were the illegal arrest of crew and passengers, the deaths of Nitzan Mendelson and Scarlett Marie Rogenkamp, the attempted killings of Methad Mustafa Kamal, Patrick Scott Baker, Jacqueline Nink Pflug and Tamar Artzi, and the illegal possession of arms and explosives. The former two charges were later withdrawn. Rezaq was sentenced to the maximum 25 years' imprisonment, less the years and months he had already spent in prison. On appeal, the sentence was confirmed on 20 April 1989.

Rezaq served only seven years in Malta and was released. As a free man under an assumed name, he went to Accra, Ghana where at the request of the American Embassy Regional Security Officer Jerald H. Barnes he was detained by the Ghana government and remained there until July 1993.

Ghanaian authorities did not give Rezaq to the United States but told them that he planned to go to Nigeria. Rezaq flew to Lagos in July 1993; U.S. intelligence officials were on board his flight to monitor him. He was arrested and extraordinary renditioned by members of the DSS, who flew him to the U.S. Rezaq's arrest was the result of an agreement between the governments of the United States and Nigeria. When Rezaq arrived at the airport, Nigerian officials denied him entry since he did not have a passport, something they knew beforehand, and placed him on the first aircraft departing Nigeria, a Gulfstream IV leased by the U.S. government. FBI agents arrested him, fingerprinted him, and flew back to the U.S.

On 19 July 1996, after a month-long trial in Washington, D.C., Rezaq was sentenced to life in prison on a single count of air piracy. Although air piracy resulting in death is a capital offense under federal law, Attorney General Janet Reno had declined to seek the death penalty. 

U.S. District Court Judge Royce C. Lamberth recommended that any request for parole made after the 10-year period should be rejected. An appeal was rejected on 6 February 1998.

Omar Mohmamed Rezaq, register number 20267-016, is imprisoned at the United States Penitentiary, Marion, located in Southern Precinct, Williamson County, Illinois.

References

Further reading
 Mizzi, John A. (1989). Massacre in Malta : The Hijack of Egyptair MS 648 , 72 p:ill. J.A. Mizzi - Valletta : Technografica, 1989. DDC : 364.162
 Johnston, David. (1996, October 7). U.S. Sentencing Due Today in 1985 Hijack. The New York Times. link
 

1950s births
Living people
20th-century criminals
Date of birth missing (living people)
Hijackers
Palestinian mass murderers
Palestinian people convicted of murder
Palestinian people imprisoned abroad
Palestinian prisoners sentenced to life imprisonment
People imprisoned on charges of terrorism
Place of birth missing (living people)
Prisoners and detainees of Malta
Prisoners sentenced to life imprisonment by the United States federal government
People convicted of murder by the United States federal government
Inmates of ADX Florence